The Headies Award for Song of the Year is an award presented at The Headies, a ceremony that was established in 2006 and originally called the Hip Hop World Awards. It was first awarded to "Busy Body" in 2006.

Recipients

Category records
Most wins 

Most nominations

Notes

References

The Headies